The 2016–17 I-League 2nd Division was the tenth season of the I-League 2nd Division, the second-tier Indian league for association football clubs, since its establishment in 2008. The season began on 21 January 2017 and featured 12 teams which was divided into three groups of four teams each. NEROCA F.C. won the title and secured the promotion to I-League. 12 teams participated in the league.

Teams

Stadiums and locations
''Note: Table lists in alphabetical order.

Personnel and kits

Foreign players
Restricting the number of foreign players strictly to three per team. A team could use two foreign players on the field each game.

Preliminary round

Group A

Fixtures and Results

Group B

Fixtures and Results

Group C

Fixtures and Results

Final round

Season statistics

Top scorers

Updated: 28 May 2017

References

External links
 I-League website.

I-League 2nd Division seasons
2016–17 in Indian football leagues